Alorton (formerly Alcoa) was a village in St. Clair County, Illinois, United States. Incorporated in 1944, it was one of three municipalities that merged to form the city of Cahokia Heights on May 6, 2021; the other two were the village of Cahokia and the city of Centreville.

The name Alorton is most likely an abbreviation of "aluminum ore town".

Geography
Alorton was located at  (38.584094, -90.117720).

Demographics

2000 Census
As of the census of 2000, there were 2,749 people, 886 households, and 670 families residing in the village. The racial makeup of the village was 1.56% White, 97.09% African American, 0.15% Native American, 0.25% from other races, and 0.95% from two or more races. Hispanic or Latino of any race were 0.73% of the population.

There were 886 households, out of which 45.8% had children under the age of 18 living with them, 23.5% were married couples living together, 46.0% had a female householder with no husband present, and 24.3% were non-families. 19.6% of all households were made up of individuals, and 7.3% had someone living alone who was 65 years of age or older. The average household size was 3.05 and the average family size was 3.43.

In the village, the population was spread out, with 39.3% under the age of 18, 9.0% from 18 to 24, 27.8% from 25 to 44, 15.7% from 45 to 64, and 8.2% who were 65 years of age or older. The median age was 26 years. For every 100 females, there were 87.8 males. For every 100 females age 18 and over, there were 78.5 males.

The median income for a household in the village was $17,860, and the median income for a family was $19,833. Males had a median income of $21,579 versus $20,188 for females. The per capita income for the village was $8,777. About 41.3% of families and 47.3% of the population were below the poverty line, including 57.8% of those under age 18 and 26.1% of those age 65 or over.

Government and infrastructure
, the United States Postal Service operates the Alorton Post Office.

Education

Curtis Miller Alternative High School is located in Alorton.

Neely Elementary School was formerly located in Alorton.

References

Former municipalities in Illinois
Former populated places in Illinois
Populated places disestablished in 2021
Villages in St. Clair County, Illinois
Villages in Illinois